Jonathan Byron Davies (born 14 September 1969) is a Welsh Anglican priest. He has served as the Vicar of Llwynderw in the Diocese of Swansea and Brecon, Church in Wales since September 2015, and as the Archdeacon of Gower since September 2016.

Davies studied theology at University of Wales, Cardiff, graduating with a Bachelor of Theology (BTh) degree in 1995, and trained for ordination at St Michael's College, Llandaff. He was ordained in the Church in Wales as a deacon in 1996 and as a priest in 1997. He was collated archdeacon on 25 September 2016.

References

1969 births
Living people
Archdeacons of Gower
20th-century Welsh Anglican priests
21st-century Welsh Anglican priests
Alumni of Cardiff University
Alumni of St Michael's College, Llandaff